Putu Ayu Saraswati (born July 6, 1997) popularly known as Ayu Saraswati is an Indonesian People's Consultative Assembly Ambassador, Medical practitioner, fashion model and beauty pageant titleholder who won the title of Puteri Indonesia Lingkungan 2020. Since 2020, she serves as the Ambassador and Advisory Council of Ministry of Women Empowerment and Child Protection of The Republic of Indonesia and Ministry of Environment and Forestry of the Republic of Indonesia, that works for #SangGuruKehidupan in advocating for women empowerment, Child protection, elderly care, natural disaster and free healthcare programs. Saraswati is the second delegate from Bali to ever be crowned Puteri Indonesia Lingkungan after Ayu Diandra Sari Tjakra in 2009. She was expected to represent Indonesia at Miss International 2022, but she withdrew from the competition.

Early life and education 

Saraswati was born in Denpasar, Bali, Indonesia to a Balinese father and Taiwanese mother. Since she was 14 years old, Saraswati is working as a fashion model and pilates instructor. She holds a Master of Medical Science (MMSc) in Biomedical sciences from the Faculty of Medicine of Udayana University, Denpasar – Bali, and currently works as a Medical Practitioner in Sanglah Hospital, where both of her parents work as a Medical Doctor.

Beside being chosen as Indonesian People's Consultative Assembly Ambassador, Ministry of Women Empowerment and Child Protection of The Republic of Indonesia Ambassador, and Ministry of Environment and Forestry of the Republic of Indonesia Ambassador. Saraswati often representing Indonesia in world forums such as Youth Gathering Sunburst Youth Camp 2014 in Singapore and the 2013 International Community Development and Global Creative Leadership Summit in New Delhi, India.

Pageantry

Jegeg Bali 2015 
Her foray into the world of pageantry began in 2015 when she won Jegeg Bali (Miss Tourism in Bali), where held in Denpasar at the age of eighteen, This also began her charitable activities which she continues to perform to this day.

As Jegeg Bali 2015 she became a charity ambassador for a local non-profit organization (NPO) Smile Foundation of Bali for the past 6 years, Saraswati donating funds and goods annually, helping to cleft lip and cleft palate patients and witnessed first-hand a Palatoplasty cleft surgery.

Puteri Bali 2020 
Saraswati joined the contest at the provincial level of the Puteri Indonesia Bali 2020, and ended up was chosen as the winner of Puteri Indonesia Bali 2020, where she also won "Miss Intelligence" special award.

Puteri Indonesia 2020 
After qualifying the provincial title of Puteri Indonesia Bali 2020, Saraswati represented the province of Bali in the national beauty contest, Puteri Indonesia 2020, which was held on March 6, 2020.

She was successfully crowned  as the winner of Puteri Indonesia Lingkungan 2020 (Miss International Indonesia 2020). by the predecessor of Puteri Indonesia Lingkungan 2019 and Miss International 2019 Top 8 Finalist Jolene Marie Cholock-Rotinsulu of North Sulawesi. and won "Puteri Indonesia Nusa-Bali Islands 2020" special awards. The final coronation night was graced by the reigning Miss International 2019, Sireethorn Leearamwat and Miss International 2017, Kevin Lilliana Junaedy as the guest star.

Saraswati successfully raised her charity foundation called #SangGuruKehidupan, which a Women's empowerment platform across the islands of Indonesia that provide child protection, elderly care and free healthcare programs. Saraswati said:

Miss International 2022 
As the winner of Puteri Indonesia Lingkungan 2020, Saraswati was expected to represent Indonesia at the 60th edition of Miss International 2022 pageant, to be held in December 2022 at Pacifico Yokohama, Yokohama City, Kanagawa Prefecture, Japan. By the end of the event, Miss International 2019 Sireethorn Leearamwat of Thailand will crown her successor. During the Puteri Indonesia 2022 competition, Saraswati announced her withdrawal from Miss International 2022. Cindy May McGuire will represent Indonesia in place of Saraswati. Saraswati will not represent Indonesia at an international pageant.

See also 
 Puteri Indonesia 2020
 Miss International 2022
 Raden Roro Ayu Maulida Putri
 Jihane Almira Chedid

References

External links
 Puteri Indonesia Official Website
 Miss International Official Website
 

Living people
1997 births
Balinese people
Udayana University alumni
Puteri Indonesia winners
Indonesian beauty pageant winners
Indonesian female models
Indonesian activists
Indonesian women activists
Health activists
Elder rights activists
Indonesian Hindus
Radical feminists
Rhetoricians
People from Denpasar
Indonesian people of Taiwanese descent